Short Heath School may refer to:

Short Heath Junior School, Willenhall, West Midlands, England
Short Heath Primary School, Erdington, Birmingham, England